"Still Within the Sound of My Voice" is a song written by Jimmy Webb and recorded by American country music artist Glen Campbell. It was released in September 1987 as the second single and title track from the album Still Within the Sound of My Voice.  The song reached number 5 on the Billboard Hot Country Singles & Tracks chart. Linda Ronstadt covered the song on her 1989 album Cry Like a Rainstorm, Howl Like the Wind.

Chart performance

References

1988 singles
Glen Campbell songs
Linda Ronstadt songs
Songs written by Jimmy Webb
Song recordings produced by Jimmy Bowen
MCA Records singles
1987 songs